The National Basketball League is a semi-professional basketball league in Uganda that is the highest division of men's basketball in the country. The league currently consists of 13 teams.

Established in 1995, media often highlights the league's physicality. The City Oilers dominated during the 2010s, winning seven straight NBL titles. The Oilers are the league's most decorated team with 8 won championships.

History 
Basketball was introduced in Uganda in 1962, by the American Peace Corps and East African teachers. During the 1970s and 80s, economic hardship in the country meant a decline of the sport in the country as many schools abandoned the game.

A national basketball league was founded in 1995 and started with six teams: the Kyambogo Warriors, Blue Jackets, Black Power, Rhino, Sky Jammers and Makerere University. Since 2003, the league was expanded with a second-level league, named Division 1. Since 2019, there has also been a third level named Division 2.

Current clubs

Past champions

Titles by team

Individual awards
Each year, the FUBA Awards are held, and the most valuable player of the league is named.

Division 1 and Division 2 winners 
The FUBA also organises the Division 1 (second level) and Division 2 (third level) leagues.

References

External links
Ugandan basketball at AfroBasket.com

Basketball competitions in Uganda
Basketball leagues in Africa